Forget Me Not 《罪爱》 is a Malaysian television series co-produced by Double Vision and ntv7. It is aired every Monday to Thursday, at 10:00pm on Malaysia's ntv7. This drama started airing on 2 August 2011 on the Malaysian channel.

This drama may be the second production by MediaCorp Studios Malaysia Sdn Bhd.

Cast

Li Family

Yang Family

Lin Family

Awards and nominations
Golden Awards 2012 
 Nominated: Best Drama
 Nominated: Most Popular Drama
 Won: Best Actress (Remon Lim)
 Won: Best Actor (Coby Chong)
 Nominated: Best Actor (Willian San)
 Nominated: Best Drama Theme Song

References

External links
Watch Forget Me Not on tonton

Chinese-language drama television series in Malaysia
2011 Malaysian television series debuts
2011 Malaysian television series endings